Primary Russia is a 1985 Soviet drama film directed by Gennady Vasilyev.

Plot 
The film takes place in Ancient Russia, when Ratibor united the Slavs into one army and rebuffed the nomads.

Cast 
 Lyudmila Chursina as Aneya
 Boris Nevzorov as Vseslav
 Innokenty Smoktunovsky as Emperor Justinian
 Margarita Terekhova as Theodora
 Elena Kondulainen as Mlava
 Arnis Licitis as Malkh
 Igor Dmitriev as Tribonian
 Vladimir Talashko as Demetrius
 Vladimir Antonik as Ratibor
 Viktor Gogolev as Velimudr
 Mikhail Kokshenov as Kolot
 Mikhail Svetin as Repartius
 Yevgeny Steblov as Hypatius
 Elguja Burduli as Belisarius
 Georgi Yumatov as sentenced to death

References

External links 
 

1985 films
1980s Russian-language films
Soviet drama films
1985 drama films
Films set in the Byzantine Empire
Films set in the 6th century
Soviet historical drama films
Gorky Film Studio films
Direct-to-video drama films
1985 direct-to-video films
Films based on Russian novels